Acanthicus hystrix, the lyre-tail pleco, is a species of armored catfish native to the Amazon, Tocantins–Araguaia and Orinoco basins. It is typically found at various depths on a rock or rock–gravel bottom in the main channel of rivers in places with moderate to strong current, although it also occurs in slow currents. The species is occasionally seen in the aquarium trade, but its adult size and territorially aggressive behavior means that a very large tank is required.

Appearance
Its color ranges from medium-brown to near-black (especially those from the Madeira, Branco and Xingu rivers are dark), and the underparts often have a vermiculated pattern. Some of the variants are commonly considered as separate, undescribed species in the aquarium trade (e.g., L193 from the Orinoco basin and L407 from the Branco basin; in the L-number system), but there is extensive overlap in the morphometrics of the different populations. Unlike the polka dot lyre-tail pleco (A. adonis), A. hystrix never has white spots. Adults males are especially spiny with extensive odontodes on the cheeks and opercle.

References

Ancistrini
Catfish of South America
Fish of the Amazon basin
Freshwater fish of Brazil
Freshwater fish of Peru
Fish described in 1829
Taxa named by Achille Valenciennes